This is a list of clubs playing Australian rules football in Tasmania at the senior level.
Guide to abbreviations: 
FC = Football Club
AFC = Australian Football Club (mainly used if in Queensland or NSW or outside Australia) / Amateur Football Club (mainly used in the other Australian States)
ARFC = Australian Rules Football Club

State Level

Tasmanian State League (TSL)

Metropolitan / Country Level

Southern Football League (SFL)

Brighton Football Club
Claremont Football Club
Cygnet Football Club
Dodges Ferry Football Club
Hobart Football Club
Huonville Football Club
Lindisfarne Football Club
New Norfolk Football Club
Sorell Football Club

North West Football League (NWFL)
Devonport Football Club
East Devonport Football Club
Latrobe Football Club
Penguin Football Club
Smithton Football Club (in recess)
Ulverstone Football Club
Wynyard Football Club

Northern Tasmanian Football Association

Premier League
George Town Football Club
Rocherlea Football Club
Scottsdale Football Club
Bridgenorth Football Club
Longford Football Club
Bracknell Football Club
Deloraine Football Club
Hillwood Football Club
South Launceston Football Club
Division 1
Old Scotch Football Club
University-Mowbray Football Club
Perth Football Club
Tamar Cats Football Club
St Patrick's Old Collegians Football Club
Evandale Football Club
Old Launcestonians Football Club
Meander Valley Football Club
Lilydale Football Club
Bridport Football Club
East Coast Football Club (Swans)

Circular Head Football Association

Scotchtown Football Club
Irishtown Football Club
Redpa Football Club
Forest-Stanley Football Club

Darwin Football Association

Ridgley Football Club
Natone Football Club
South Burnie Football Club
Somerset Football Club
Yeoman Football Club
Yolla Football Club
Queenstown Football Club
Cuprona Football Club

King Island Football Association

Currie Football Club
Grassy Football Club
North Football Club

North Eastern Football Union

Winnaleah Football Club
Bridport Football Club
East Coast Swans Football Club
Scottsdale Crows Football Club
Branxholm Football Club (In Recess)

North Western Football Association

Spreyton Football Club
Wesley Vale Football Club
Forth Football Club
Motton Preston Football Club
East Ulverstone Football Club
Sheffield Football Club
Turners Beach Football Club
Rosebery Toorak Football Club
West Ulverstone Football Club

Oatlands District Football Association

Mount Pleasant Football Club
Oatlands Football Club
Swansea Football Club
Campania Football Club
Campbell Town Football Club
Tasman Peninsula Football Club
Triabunna Football Club
Bothwell Football Club
Woodsdale Football Club (In Recess)

Old Scholars Football Association

University Football Club
St Virgils Football Club
OHA Football Club
Richmond Football Club
DOSA Football Club
Hutchins Football Club
Channel Football Club (In Recess)

Lists of Australian rules football clubs
Australian rules football clubs